Club Deportivo Pontejos is a football team based in Pontejos, Marina de Cudeyo in the autonomous community of Cantabria. Founded in 1962, the team plays in Tercera División – Group 3. The club's home ground is Nuevo San Lázaro, which has a capacity of 800 spectators.

Season to season

15 seasons in Tercera División

External links
Official blog 
Futbolme.com profile 

Football clubs in Cantabria
Association football clubs established in 1962
1962 establishments in Spain